Thunder Bay—Atikokan was a federal electoral district in northwestern Ontario, Canada,  that was represented in the House of Commons of Canada from 1979 to 2003 and in the Legislative Assembly of Ontario from 1999 to 2007. The federal riding was created in 1976, from parts of Fort William and Thunder Bay ridings. It became a provincial riding in 1999.

It initially consisted of the part of the Territorial District of Rainy River east of the 4th Meridian, including the whole of the Township of Atikokan; and the southwest part of the Territorial District of Thunder Bay, including the southern part of the city of Thunder Bay, Ontario.

The electoral district was abolished in 2003 when it was redistributed between Thunder Bay—Rainy River and Thunder Bay—Superior North ridings.

Members of Parliament

This riding has elected the following Members of Parliament:

Election results

|}

|}

|}

|}

|}

|}

|}

See also 

 List of Canadian federal electoral districts
 Past Canadian electoral districts

External links 

 Website of the Parliament of Canada

Former federal electoral districts of Ontario
Politics of Thunder Bay